Agonopterix ferulae is a moth of the family Depressariidae. It is found in Portugal, France and Italy and on Sicily and Cyprus. It has also been recorded from Morocco.

The larvae feed on Ferula communis.

References

Moths described in 1847
Agonopterix
Moths of Europe
Moths of Africa